Antiopella is a genus of small to large sea slugs, or more accurately nudibranchs, marine gastropod mollusks, in the family Janolidae.

Description
Species of Antiopella were included in Janolus for a period of time.

Distribution

Ecology

Habitat 
This genus of nudibranch is found in shallow and subtidal waters.

Feeding habits 
Antiopella species feed on Bryozoa, moss animals.

Species
Species in the genus Antiopella include:
 Antiopella barbarensis (J. G. Cooper, 1863)
 Antiopella capensis (Bergh, 1907)
 Antiopella cristata (Delle Chiaje, 1841)
 Antiopella fusca (O'Donoghue, 1924)
 Antiopella longidentata (Gosliner, 1981)
 Antiopella novozealandica Eliot, 1907
 Antiopella praeclara Bouchet, 1975

References

Proctonotidae
Gastropod genera